Otto Wilhelm von Fersen (1623, Reval – 1703, Kurna) was a Swedish general and nobleman of the Fersen family, governor general of Ingmermanland and Kexholm from 1691 to 1698, field marshal 1693. He was the son of Hermann von Fersen the elder and cousin to Fabian von Fersen.

After his death he was buried in St Mary's Cathedral, Tallinn, where a sarcophagus, probably created by the sculptor Johann Gustav Stockenberg, was erected in his memory.

See also
Fersen

References

1623 births
1703 deaths
17th-century Estonian people
17th-century Swedish military personnel
Field marshals of Sweden
Baltic-German people
Swedish people of Baltic German descent
People from Tallinn
Burials at St Mary's Cathedral, Tallinn
Fersen family